Košarkaški klub Meridiana, was a men's professional basketball club based in Novi Sad, Serbia. The club is used to compete in the Basketball League of Serbia.

History
The club was founded on February 16, 2010, as part of the sports club of the same name. Only three years after its foundation, they made their Basketball League of Serbia debut during the 2013–14 season.

Players

Coaches 

  Ljubomir Poček (2010)
  Zoran Stojačić (2010–2011)
  Mile Medaković (2011–2012)
  Filip Socek (2012–2014)

Season by season

Trophies and awards

Trophies
Second League of Serbia (2nd-tier)
Winner (1): 2012–13

External links
 Official website
 KK Meridiana at srbijasport.net

Meridiana
Sport in Novi Sad
Basketball teams established in 2010
Basketball teams disestablished in 2015